Ernest Bristow Farrar (7 July 1885 – 18 September 1918) was an English composer, pianist and organist.

Life
Ernest Farrar was born in Lewisham, London, but moved in 1887 to Micklefield in Yorkshire, where his father was a clergyman. The rest of his life was very much centred in the north of England. He was educated at Leeds Grammar School, where he began organ studies. His studies at Durham University did not progress beyond his matriculation.

In May 1905 he won a scholarship to the Royal College of Music. There he studied with Sir Charles Villiers Stanford and Sir Walter Parratt and began friendships with Frank Bridge  and Geoffrey Molyneux Palmer. He also took up several posts as organist in All Saints' Dresden, St Hilda's, South Shields and Christ Church, High Harrogate. At Harrogate, he worked closely with local conductor Julian Clifford and took on the 14-year-old Gerald Finzi as a composition pupil. In 1913, he married Olive Mason in South Shields. His best man at the wedding was Ernest Bullock.

His career was cut short by the outbreak of World War I, as he enlisted in the Grenadier Guards in 1915 and joined the regiment in August 1916. He was commissioned as Second Lieutenant, 3rd Battalion Devonshire Regiment on 27 February 1918.

Farrar was killed on the Western Front at the Battle of Epehy Ronssoy, near Le Cateau in the Somme Valley south, west of Cambrai, on 18 September 1918. He had been at the front for two days.

His grave lies just outside the churchyard wall in Ronssoy Communal Cemetery Extension, in a corner under a few trees. A Requiem Mass was said at Micklefield, on 29 September, the Feast of St. Michael and All Angels. A concert was dedicated to his memory at Harrogate by Julian Clifford on 17 September 1919, including the tone-poem Lights Out, written expressly for Farrar, and Farrar's Variations in G On An Old British Sea-Song for piano and orchestra.

Works and legacy
Despite his short life, Farrar wrote a large body of music for orchestra, voices and organ. His works include The Blessed Damozel, a Celtic Suite and the song cycle Vagabond Songs. Two orchestral pieces, the suite English Pastoral Impressions and the Three Spiritual Studies (for string orchestra) were published posthumously under the Carnegie Collection of British Music imprint. However, apart from a few songs his works are now rarely performed. Stephen Banfield has identified several characteristic traits in Farrar's music, representative of the English pre-war era: the use of folksong (English Pastoral Impressions); "muscular" settings of Walt Whitman (in the choral suite Out of Doors, Op. 14); and intimate lyricism (in Margaritae sorori, a choral setting of words by W. E. Henley from 1916).

Some of his orchestral music has been recorded by the Philharmonia Orchestra on the Chandos label, and some of his songs and organ works have been recorded too.

Today, Farrar is perhaps best known as the teacher of Gerald Finzi, who was deeply affected by Farrar's death. Frank Bridge was also deeply affected, and dedicated his Piano Sonata to the memory of Farrar.

References

External links
 
 Farrar biography
 
 

1885 births
1918 deaths
20th-century British male musicians
20th-century classical composers
20th-century English composers
20th-century organists
Academics of the Royal College of Music
Alumni of the Royal College of Music
British Army personnel of World War I
British male organists
British military personnel killed in World War I
Devonshire Regiment officers
English classical composers
English classical organists
English male classical composers
Musicians from Kent
People educated at Leeds Grammar School
People from Lewisham
Male classical organists